Arbab Kandi (also Romanized as Arbāb Kandī; also known as Arbāb, Arva, Arveh, Avra, and Evreh) is a village in Naqdi Rural District, Meshgin-e Sharqi District, Meshgin Shahr County, Ardabil Province, Iran. At the 2006 census, its population was 903, in 209 families.

References 

Towns and villages in Meshgin Shahr County